Cornelius Lawrence Ludlow Leary (October 22, 1813 – March 21, 1893) was an American politician from Maryland.

Leary was born in Baltimore, Maryland, and attended the public schools.  He graduated from St. Mary's College of Baltimore in 1833, and afterwards moved to Louisville, Kentucky.  He returned to Baltimore in 1837, and served as a Whig member of the Maryland House of Delegates in 1838 and 1839.  He studied law, was admitted to the bar in 1840, and commenced practice in Baltimore.  He was also a presidential elector on Maryland's victorious American Party ticket in 1856.

Leary was elected as a Unionist to the Thirty-seventh Congress, where he served from March 4, 1861, to March 3, 1863.  After his term in Congress, he resumed the practice of law in Baltimore, where he died.  He is interred in Lorraine Cemetery.

References

1813 births
1893 deaths
Members of the United States House of Representatives from Maryland
Members of the Maryland House of Delegates
Maryland Unionists
Maryland Know Nothings
Maryland Whigs
Unionist Party members of the United States House of Representatives
1856 United States presidential electors
19th-century American politicians